Pope-elect Stephen (died 25 March 752) was a Roman priest selected in March 752 to succeed Pope Zachary. Because he died before he was consecrated, he is considered only a  rather than a legitimate pope.

Papacy
In 745, Stephen was made a cardinal-priest by Pope Zachary. His titular church was San Crisogono. Zachary died in mid-March 752. On 23 March, Stephen was selected to become the new pope. He died of a stroke only days later, before being consecrated as bishop of Rome. 

According to the canon law of the time, a pope's pontificate started upon his consecration. Later canon law considered that a man became pope the moment he accepted his election, and Pope-elect Stephen was then anachronistically called Pope Stephen II. His name was removed from the list of popes in the Annuario Pontificio in 1961.

See also
List of 10 shortest-reigning popes
Pope John XX

References

8th-century popes
Popes
752 deaths
Year of birth unknown
Place of birth unknown
Burials at St. Peter's Basilica